My Friend Victor (French: Mon ami Victor) is a 1931 French comedy film directed by André Berthomieu and starring René Lefèvre, Pierre Brasseur and Simone Bourday. The film may have originally been made a silent and then had sound added to it.

The film's sets were designed by the art director Robert-Jules Garnier.

Cast
 René Lefèvre as Victor de Fleury  
 Pierre Brasseur as Edgar Flachon  
 Simone Bourday as Hélène  
 Gabrielle Fontan as Tante Ursule 
 Alice Ael as Mme. Lambert  
 Émile Garandet as M. Lambert

References

Bibliography 
 Crisp, C.G. Genre, Myth, and Convention in the French Cinema, 1929-1939. Indiana University Press, 2002.

External links 
 

1931 films
French comedy films
1931 comedy films
1930s French-language films
Films directed by André Berthomieu
French black-and-white films
1930s French films